Diphenoxylate/atropine, also known as co-phenotrope, is a combination of the medications diphenoxylate and atropine, used to treat diarrhea. It should not be used in those in whom Clostridioides difficile infection is a concern. It is taken by mouth. Onset is typically within an hour.

Side effects may include abdominal pain, angioedema, glaucoma, heart problems, feeling tired, dry mouth, and trouble seeing. It is unclear if use in pregnancy is safe and use when breastfeeding may result in side effects in the baby. It works by decreasing contractions of the bowel.

The combination was approved for medical use in the United States in 1960. It is available as a generic medication.  In 2019, it was the 339th most commonly prescribed medication in the United States, with more than 900thousand prescriptions. It is sold under the brand name Lomotil among others. The medication is in Schedule V in the United States.

Contraindications
Absolute contraindications are:
 Patients under 6 years of age
Allergy to diphenoxylate or atropine
 Diarrhea associated with pseudomembranous enterocolitis, diarrhea caused by antibiotic treatment, or diarrhea caused by enterotoxin-producing bacteria, such as Clostridium difficile
 Obstructive jaundice

Side effects

The drug combination is generally safe in short-term use and with recommended dosage. In doses used for the treatment of diarrhea, whether acute or chronic, diphenoxylate has not produced addiction.

It may cause several side-effects, such as dry mouth, headache, constipation and blurred vision. Since it may also cause drowsiness or dizziness, it should not be used by motorists, operators of hazardous machinery, etc. It is not recommended for children under two years of age.

Interactions
Interactions with other drugs:
 Antidepressants (e.g. Elavil, Prozac)
 Monoamine oxidase inhibitors (e.g. Nardil, Parnate)
 Opioid analgesics
 Sedatives (e.g. Ambien, Sonata)

Diarrhea that is caused by some antibiotics such as cefaclor, erythromycin or tetracycline can worsen.

Toxicity

It may cause serious health problems when overdosed. Signs and symptoms of adverse effects may include any or several of the following: convulsions, respiratory depression (slow or stopped breathing), dilated eye pupils, nystagmus (rapid side-to-side eye movements), erythema (flushed skin), gastrointestinal constipation, nausea, vomiting, paralytic ileus, tachycardia (rapid pulse), drowsiness and hallucinations. Symptoms of toxicity may take up to 12 hours to appear.

Treatment of overdose must be initiated immediately after diagnosis and may include the following: ingestion of activated charcoal, laxative and a counteracting medication (narcotic antagonist).

Mechanism of action 

Diphenoxylate is anti-diarrheal and atropine is anticholinergic. A subtherapeutic amount of atropine sulfate is present to discourage deliberate overdosage. Atropine has no anti-diarrheal properties, but will cause tachycardia when overused. The medication diphenoxylate works by slowing down the movement of the intestines. In some cases it has been shown to ease symptoms of opiate withdrawal.

History 
 	
Diphenoxylate was developed in 1954 as part of US Navy and CIA-funded research on nonaddictive substitutes for codeine.

Society and culture

Names
The UK British Approved Name (BAN) generic name for diphenoxylate and atropine is co-phenotrope.

As of 2018, the combination drug is marketed in the US and some other countries under the following brands: Atridol, Atrolate, Atrotil, Co-Phenotrope, Dhamotil, Dimotil, Intard, Logen, Lomanate, Lomotil, Lonox, and Reasec.

Legal status
In the United States, it is classified as a Schedule V controlled substance by federal law, and is available only for a medical purpose.

References

External links
 

Antidiarrhoeals
Combination drugs
Wikipedia medicine articles ready to translate